Pokkunuru is a village in Krishna district of the Indian state of Andhra Pradesh. It is located in Chandarlapadu mandal of Vijayawada revenue division. It is forms a part of Andhra Pradesh Capital Region.

"Andhra Pithamaha" Madapati Hanumantha Rao (1885–1970) social reformer of Hyderabad was born in this village.

Education 
The Primary  School Education is Imparted by the Government School, Under the State School Education Department.

Politics 
On 2013 Panchayat elections were conducted and Komati Prabhkarao is the present sarpanch from Telugu Desam Party.

Demographics 
According to Indian census, 2001, the demographic details of this village is as follows:
 Total Population: 	1,949 in 442 Households.
 Male Population: 	989
 Female Population: 	960
 Children Under 6-years of age: 244 (Boys – 125 and Girls – 119)
 Total Literates: 	1,217

References 

Villages in Krishna district